Arab Radio and Television Network (acronym: ART) is an Arabic-language television network characterized by its multitude of channels. It is based in Jeddah, Saudi Arabia.

History and profile
ART was founded in October 15, 1993 by Saleh Abdullah Kamel, a Saudi businessman and is a private company specializing in family entertainment, including movies, music and sport.

ART was particularly known in Saudi Arabia for its exclusive sports event broadcasts, especially the Saudi Leagues. The network lost a significant amount of its audience share after the launch of many similar free-to-air channels like the Rotana network, owned by Al-Waleed bin Talal. At the time of launch, ART produced over 6,000 live and recorded shows per year, including family-oriented dramas, series, plays, sports programs, music videos and documentaries. 

ART is broadcasting via the Arabsat, Nilesat and Hot Bird satellites. Most ART Channels are encrypted using Irdeto 2 Encryption. ART's technical broadcast facilities are based in Jordan Media City in Amman, Jordan.

In November 24, 2009, Al Jazeera purchased all of ART's sport channels which had the license to broadcast the FIFA World Cup 2010 and 2014 matches.  ART Sports was subsequently rebranded as Al Jazeera Sports (since 2014, BeIN Sports). Later that year, ART also sold most of its remaining entertainment channels to Orbit Showtime Network.

ART channels list 
Arab Radio and TV Network consists of the following channels:

Current channels
TV
 ART Aflam 1: Arabic movie channel one
 ART Aflam 2: Arabic movie channel two
 ART Cinema: Arabic movie channel three
 ART Hekayat: Arabic series Pop-up channel
 ART Hekayat 2: Arabic series channel two
 ART Hekayat HD: Arabic series Pop-up channel in HD during Ramadan
 ART Hekayat 2 HD: Arabic series channel in HD during Ramadan
 Cima: Arabic movie channel four
 Iqraa: Arabic Islamic channel
 ART Movies: Arabic movie channel five, broadcast in North America, Asia-Pacific and Australia
 ART: International Arabic channel, broadcast in North America and Brazil
 ART Tarab: Arabic classic music and opera channel, broadcast in North America and Australia
 Iqraa International: Non-Arabic-speaking Islamic channel (English and French)
 Iqraa Bangla: UK-based, Bengali Islamic channel

Radio
 ART Music Radio
 Dhikr Radio for the Holy Quran

Former channels
ART branded channels
 ART Eye
 ART Sport 1-9
 ART Prime Sport
 ART 1
 ART 2
 ART 3
 ART 4
 ART 5
 ART Children
 ART Music
 ART Monasabat
 ART Shopping
 ART Hekayat Zaman
 ART Teenz
 ART Al-Talimiyah
 ART Open University
 Ayen Al-Awail
 ART Travel
 ART Movie World
 ART Hekayat Kaman
 ART Hekayat Kaman HD
 ART America
 ART Variety

Distributed channels
 Jetix
 Hallmark Channel
 Channel [V]
 National Geographic Channel
 Nat Geo Adventure
 Nat Geo Wild
 CBS Reality
 Cartoon Network
 Boomerang
 BabyTV
 Discovery Science
 Animal Planet
 Sky News
 STAR Plus
 STAR News
 Sony Max
 Sony Entertainment Television Asia
 STAR Gold
 ITV Granada
 Zee TV
 Zee Cinema
 NDTV 24x7
 STAR One
 TCM
 Sahara One
 B4U Movies
 B4U Music
 Indus Vision
 Geo TV
 Kairali TV
 Jaya TV

See also

Showtime Arabia
Orbit Satellite Television and Radio Network
List of direct broadcast satellite providers
List of digital television deployments by country

References

External links

 aflam arabia
   ART Network demographics and Audience

Television networks
Arab mass media
Mass media in Jeddah
Companies based in Jeddah
Television channels and stations established in 1993
Television in Saudi Arabia
Saudi Arabian companies established in 1993
Mass media companies established in 1993